Marko Nikolić may refer to:

 Marko Nikolić (actor) (1946–2019), Serbian actor
 Marko Nikolić (footballer, born June 1989) (born 1989), Serbian footballer for Voždovac
 Marko Nikolić (footballer, born August 1989) (born 1989), Serbian footballer for Kolonija Kovin on loan from Smederevo
 Marko Nikolić (footballer, born 1997), Swedish footballer for KVC Westerlo
 Marko Nikolić (football manager) (born 1979), Serbian football manager
 Marko Nikolić (footballer, born 1998), Serbian footballer for Budafoki MTE